In the Valleys of the Southern Rhine (German: Die vom Niederrhein) is a 1925 German silent film directed by Rudolf Walther-Fein and Rudolf Dworsky and starring Albert Steinrück, Erna Morena, and Ernst Hofmann.

The film's art direction was by Jacek Rotmil.

Cast

References

Bibliography
 Grange, William. Cultural Chronicle of the Weimar Republic. Scarecrow Press, 2008.

External links

1925 films
Films of the Weimar Republic
German silent feature films
German black-and-white films